This is a list of sports anime, manga, OVAs, ONAs, and films.

Notes

References

Bibliography 

Lists of anime by genre
Lists of manga by genre